is a passenger railway station  located in the city of Itami, Hyōgo Prefecture, Japan. It is operated by the West Japan Railway Company (JR West).

Lines

Station layout
The station consists of one ground-level island platform serving two tracks, connected to the station building by a footbridge. There are two depot tracks on the west side of the platform, and the last trains arriving at Takarazuka Station and the rapid trains arriving at some Shin-Sanda Station return here overnight. The station has a staffed ticket office.

Platforms

Adjacent stations

History
Kita-Itami Station opened on 1 April 1944.  With the privatization of the Japan National Railways (JNR) on 1 April 1987, the station came under the aegis of the West Japan Railway Company.

Station numbering was introduced in March 2018 with Kita-Itami being assigned station number JR-G53.

Passenger statistics
In fiscal 2016, the station was used by an average of 5370 passengers daily

Surrounding area
The station is located about 600 m north-west from the runway of Osaka International Airport, thus there is a board to notice that it is very hard to tell passengers when trains arrive at the station due to the jet engine sounds of the planes taking off and landing at the airport.
 Hyogo Prefectural Nishiina Park
Itami Municipal Roller Skating Rink
Japan Ground Self-Defense Force Itami Garrison

See also
List of railway stations in Japan

References

External links 

  Kita-Itami Station from JR-Odekake.net 

Railway stations in Hyōgo Prefecture
Railway stations in Japan opened in 1944
Itami, Hyōgo